Rag Doll, released in the USA as Young, Willing and Eager, is a 1961 British B-movie crime film, directed by Lance Comfort and starring actor and singer Jess Conrad.  The film gained a new audience in the 2000s in response to Conrad's elevation to cult status as a purveyor of late-1950s and early-1960s pre-Beatles British kitsch, and received a Region 2 DVD release in 2009 in a double bill with Comfort's 1962 film The Painted Smile.

Plot
Seventeen-year-old Carol (Christina Gregg) flees her small-town home to escape from her alcoholic stepfather, and heads off to London.  Once in London she is drawn to the sleazy excitement of Soho and finds work in a coffee bar. She falls in love with handsome young nightclub singer Joe Shane (Conrad) and soon they are a couple.  She then discovers that Joe is a small-time crook on the side, with a gang background and a line in burglary.

At work, Carol finds herself on the receiving end of advances from all manner of men, including her boss, Mort Wilson (Kenneth Griffith), who, though older, professes to be in love with her.  When Carol becomes pregnant, Joe decides to do "one last job" to make the money to take them to a fresh start in Canada. He burgles Mort's house but Mort catches him. After shooting Mort dead, Joe, himself severely wounded, goes on the run with Carol in a stolen car. However because of his injuries they crash in a country lane and carry on by foot. Pursued by the police in a field Joe still holding his gun finally collapses and dies from his injuries.

Cast
 Jess Conrad as Joe Shane
 Hermione Baddeley as Auntie
 Kenneth Griffith as Mort Wilson
 Christina Gregg as Carol
 Patrick Magee as Flynn
 Patrick Jordan as Wills
 Michael Wynne as Bellamy
 Frank Forsyth as Superintendent

External links 
 
 Rag Doll at BFI Film & TV Database

1961 films
1961 crime films
British crime films
Films directed by Lance Comfort
British black-and-white films
Films shot at Nettlefold Studios
Films set in London
1960s English-language films
1960s British films